The anthem of the Anzoátegui State, Venezuela, was written by Enrique Pérez Valencia. The melody that accompanies it was composed by César Ramírez Gómez.

Lyrics in Spanish

Chorus
(chorus)

Lyrics in English Language
Chorus
Yesterday you were strong and haughty,
in the bloody and tenacious fight;
but now, homeland you wear the olive,
and today your glory is founded in peace.

I 
Illustrious homeland! Your sons remember
with pride the tragic fight:
still it seems that it’s heard around
the tremendous roar of the canon.
That the blood in torrents you poured,
and in the Homeric vie you grew,
forcing the martial heart.

II 
In the arms of illustrious warriors,
with Anzoátegui, Freites, Monagas,
you destroyed the belligerent plague
and erected yourself triumphal everywhere;
In the glorious and feral vie
against Iberia of heroic stubbornness,
yours was the hindermost bizarreness;
yours was the ulterior victory.

(chorus)

See also
 List of anthems of Venezuela

Anthems of Venezuela
Spanish-language songs